Aaron Pedersen is an Aboriginal Australian television and film actor. He is known for many film and television roles, in particular as Detective Jay Swan in the film Mystery Road, its sequel Goldstone, and  spin-off television series. He has been nominated for many and won several acting awards, including the 2021 AACTA Award for International Award for Best Actor in a Series.

Early life
Pedersen, who is of Arrernte and Arabana descent, was born and grew up in Alice Springs, one of eight children. He and his seven siblings grew up in foster homes away from their alcoholic mother, Margaret, and experienced much family violence in the home. From an early age, he looked after his brother, Vinnie, who has cerebral palsy and a mild intellectual disability.

In the early 1990s, Pedersen underwent a cadetship at the ABC in Melbourne, and worked as a journalist and presenter. He was a host for the TV series Blackout.

Career
His acting career began in 1994, when he starred in the miniseries Heartland and was voted Bachelor of the Year by Cleo magazine. He came to notice in 1995 as co-host of Gladiators Australia, an Australian game show.

Pedersen's first major acting role was as lawyer Vince Cellini in Wildside in 1997. In 1999, he played Detective Senior Constable Michael Reilly in Water Rats, and took a major role in The Secret Life of Us (2005).

Since 2007, he had the leading role in SBS's drama series The Circuit, and from 2007 to 2011 he appeared in Channel Seven's drama City Homicide. He appeared as Cam Delray in ABC Television's Jack Irish series, beginning in 2012 and running for several seasons.

Pedersen took the lead role of Detective Jay Swan in Ivan Sen's Mystery Road (2013), a role he reprised in its sequel film Goldstone (2016), and its spin-off television series (2018-2020).

He played war veteran Frank Gibbs in A Place to Call Home (2017-2018) and Tom Campbell in Total Control (2019).
In 2020 to 2021 he was the presenter for an ABC Television documentary series Australia Remastered. In the same year he featured as a presenter with the writer Holly Ringland in an 8-episode documentary series on ABC Television called Back to Nature.

Recognition
In 2007 Pedersen was the recipient of the Bob Maza Fellowship, which recognises emerging acting talent and support professional development for Indigenous actors.

Awards
Pedersen has been nominated for many and won several awards.

He won the Best Actor award at the Melbourne Underground Film Festival for Darklovestory (2006).

My Brother Vinnie (2006) won the Best Short Documentary award at the Melbourne International Film Festival and was nominated for an IF Award for Best Short Documentary.  Pedersen was also nominated for a Deadly Award for Outstanding Achievement in Film.

Pedersen won a Deadly Award nomination for Male Actor of the Year in 2003 and 2011, and was nominated for it in 2007.

In 2013 he was nominated for Best Performance by an Actor in the Asia Pacific Screen Awards, for his role in the film Mystery Road.

After being nominated several times over the years for AFI and AACTA Awards, in 2021 he won the AACTA International Award for Best Actor in a Series, for his role in Mystery Road.

Other roles
Pedersen speaks at schools and prisons, and is concerned at the rate of incarceration of Indigenous Australians, seeing parallels with the early history of Australia, being founded as a penal colony; the link between poverty and crime.
Other speaking roles include emceeing various events, including the Melbourne Indigenous Arts Festival, and has hosted Black Nite Film Festival since 2009. He was co-host of the 2011 Deadly Awards, and has undertaken many other public speaking engagements.

Personal life
Pedersen looked out for his younger brother Vinnie, who has cerebral palsy and mild intellectual disabilities, on and off since he was a child. In 1997, when Aaron was following his career as an actor in Sydney, their grandmother, who had been helping to care for Vinnie in Alice Springs, died. There were no services available nor other family support, so Aaron took on the role as full-time carer and Vinnie joined him in Sydney. After things got difficult for Aaron, his de facto mother-in-law, Mum Frances, stepped in and Vinnie moved in with her.

Vinnie accompanies Aaron during his filming. The short documentary film My Brother Vinnie (2006), written by Pedersen, directed by Steven McGregor, and shot by Warwick Thornton (both friends), was selected for the Melbourne International Film Festival and Message Sticks Indigenous Film Festival.

Pedersen's partner in life is Sarah Bond. He says that caring for Vinnie means that there is no space in their lives for children. He loves working with wood, and has a "secret desire to be a tradie".

Filmography

Film

Television

Short film

References

Further reading
"Aaron Pedersen is a different kind of archetypal leading man" by Elisabeth Vincentelli, The New York Times, 13 October 2020

External links
 

Living people
Australian game show hosts
Australian male television actors
Indigenous Australian male actors
Male actors from the Northern Territory
People from Alice Springs
1970 births